Trifolium nigrescens, the small white clover, is an annual species which is widespread around the Mediterranean, including north Africa, and the Middle East.

References

nigrescens
Flora of Europe
Flora of Western Asia
Flora of North Africa